Bowerbirds make up the bird family Ptilonorhynchidae. They are renowned for their unique courtship behaviour, where males build a structure and decorate it with sticks and brightly coloured objects in an attempt to attract a mate.

The family has 27 species in eight genera. Their diet consists mainly of fruit but may also include insects (especially for nestlings), flowers, nectar and leaves in some species. The satin and spotted bowerbirds are sometimes considered agricultural pests due to their habit of feeding on introduced fruit and vegetable crops and have occasionally been killed by affected orchardists.

The bowerbirds have an Austro-Papuan distribution, with ten species endemic to New Guinea, eight endemic to Australia, and two found in both. Although their distribution is centered on the tropical regions of New Guinea and northern Australia, some species extend into central, western, and southeastern Australia. They occupy a range of different habitats, including rainforest, eucalyptus and acacia forest, and shrublands.

Behaviour and ecology
The Ailuroedus catbirds are monogamous, with males raising chicks with their partner, but all other bowerbirds are polygynous, with the female building the nest and raising the young alone. These latter species are commonly dimorphic, with the female being drabber in color. Female bowerbirds build a nest by laying soft materials, such as leaves, ferns, and vine tendrils, on top of a loose foundation of sticks.

All Papuan bowerbirds lay one egg, while Australian species lay one to three with laying intervals of two days. Eggs hatch after 19 to 24 days, depending on the species and are a plain cream color for catbirds and the tooth-billed bowerbird, but in other species possess brownish wavy lines similar to eggs of Australo-Papuan babblers. In accordance with their lengthy incubation periods, bowerbirds that lay more than one egg have asynchronous hatching, but siblicide has never been observed.

Bowerbirds as a group have the longest life expectancy of any passerine family with significant banding studies. The two most studied species, the green catbird and satin bowerbird, have life expectancies of around eight to ten years and one satin bowerbird has been known to live for twenty-six years. For comparison, the common raven, the heaviest passerine species with significant banding records, has not been known to live longer than 21 years.

Courtship and mating 
The most notable characteristic of bowerbirds is their extraordinarily complex courtship and mating behaviour, where males build a bower to attract mates. There are two main types of bowers. Prionodura, Amblyornis, Scenopoeetes and Archiboldia bowerbirds build so-called maypole bowers, which are constructed by placing sticks around a sapling; in the former two species these bowers have a hut-like roof. Chlamydera, Sericulus and Ptilonorhynchus bowerbirds build an avenue type-bower made of two walls of vertically placed sticks. Ailuroedus catbirds are the only species which do not construct either bowers or display courts. In and around the bower, the male places a variety of brightly colored objects he has collected. These objects – usually different among each species – may include hundreds of shells, leaves, flowers, feathers, stones, berries, and even discarded plastic items, coins, nails, rifle shells, or pieces of glass. The males spend hours arranging this collection. Bowers within a species share a general form but do show significant variation, and the collection of objects reflects the biases of males of each species and its ability to procure items from the habitat, often stealing them from neighboring bowers. Several studies of different species have shown that colors of decorations males use on their bowers match the preferences of females.

In addition to the bower construction and ornamentation, male birds perform involved courtship displays to attract the female.  Research suggests the male adjusts his performance based on success and female response.

Mate-searching females commonly visit multiple bowers, often returning to preferred bowers several times, and watching males' elaborate courtship displays and inspecting the quality of the bower.  Through this process the female reduces the set of potential mates. Many females end up selecting the same male, and many under-performing males are left without copulations. Females mated with top-mating males tend to return to the male the next year and search less.

It has been suggested that there is an inverse relationship between bower complexity and the brightness of plumage. There may be an evolutionary "transfer" of ornamentation in some species, from their plumage to their bowers, in order to reduce the visibility of the male and thereby its vulnerability to predation. This hypothesis is not well supported because species with vastly different bower types have similar plumage. Others have suggested that the bower functioned initially as a device that benefits females by protecting them from forced copulations and thus giving them enhanced opportunity to choose males and benefits males by enhancing female willingness to visit the bower.  Evidence supporting this hypothesis comes from observations of Archbold's bowerbirds that have no true bower and have greatly modified their courtship so that the male is limited in his ability to mount the female without her cooperation. In tooth-billed bowerbirds that have no bowers, males may capture females out of the air and forcibly copulate with them.  Once this initial function was established, bowers were then co-opted by females for other functions such as use in assessing males based on the quality of bower construction.  Recent studies with robot female bowerbirds have shown that males react to female signals of discomfort during courtship by reducing the intensity of their potentially threatening courtship. Young females tend to be more easily threatened by intense male courtship, and these females tend to choose males based on traits not dependent on male courtship intensity.

The high degree of effort directed at mate choice by females and the large skews in mating success directed at males with quality displays suggests that females gain important benefits from mate choice.  Since males have no role in parental care and give nothing to females except sperm, it is suggested that females gain genetic benefits from their mate choice.  However this has not been established, in part because of the difficulty of following offspring performance since males take seven years to reach sexual maturity. One hypothesis for the evolutionary causation of the bowerbuilding display is Hamilton and Zuk's "bright bird" hypothesis, which states that sexual ornaments are indicators of general health and heritable disease resistance. Doucet and Montgomerie  determined that the male bowerbird's plumage reflectance indicates internal parasitic infection, whereas the bower quality is a measure of external parasitic infection. This would suggest that the bowerbird mating display evolved due to parasite mediated sexual selection, though there is some controversy surrounding this conclusion.

This complex mating behaviour, with its highly valued types and colors of decorations, has led some researchers to regard the bowerbirds as among the most behaviorally complex species of bird. It also provides some of the most compelling evidence that the extended phenotype of a species can play a role in sexual selection and indeed act as a powerful mechanism to shape its evolution, as seems to be the case for humans. Inspired by their seemingly extreme courtship rituals, Charles Darwin discussed both bowerbirds and birds-of-paradise in his writings.

In addition, many species of bowerbird are superb vocal mimics. MacGregor's bowerbird, for example, has been observed imitating pigs, waterfalls, and human chatter.  Satin bowerbirds commonly mimic other local species as part of their courtship display.

Bowerbirds have also been observed creating optical illusions in their bowers to appeal to mates. They arrange objects in the bower's court area from smallest to largest, creating a forced perspective which holds the attention of the female for longer. Males with objects arranged in a way that have a strong optical illusion are likely to have higher mating success.

Taxonomy and systematics 

Though bowerbirds have traditionally been regarded as closely related to the birds of paradise, recent molecular studies suggest that while both families are part of the great corvid radiation that took place in or near Australia-New Guinea, the bowerbirds are more distant from the birds of paradise than was once thought. DNA–DNA hybridization studies placed them close to the lyrebirds; however, anatomical evidence appears to contradict this placement, and the true relationship remains unclear.

Genus Ailuroedus
 Ochre-breasted catbird, Ailuroedus stonii
 White-eared catbird, Ailuroedus buccoides
 Tan-capped catbird, Ailuroedus geislerorum
 Green catbird, Ailuroedus crassirostris
 Spotted catbird, Ailuroedus maculosus
 Huon catbird, Ailuroedus astigmaticus
 Black-capped catbird, Ailuroedus melanocephalus
 Northern catbird, Ailuroedus jobiensis
 Arfak catbird, Ailuroedus arfakianus
 Black-eared catbird, Ailuroedus melanotis

Genus Scenopoeetes
 Tooth-billed catbird, Scenopoeetes dentirostris

Genus Archboldia
 Archbold's bowerbird, Archboldia papuensis
 Sanford's bowerbird, Archboldia sanfordi (This species' validity is disputed; currently considered conspecific with Archboldia papuensis in most references.)

Genus Amblyornis
 Vogelkop bowerbird, Amblyornis inornata
 MacGregor's bowerbird, Amblyornis macgregoriae
 Huon bowerbird, Amblyornis germanus
 Streaked bowerbird, Amblyornis subalaris
 Golden-fronted bowerbird, Amblyornis flavifrons

Genus Prionodura
 Golden bowerbird, Prionodura newtoniana

Genus Sericulus
 Flame bowerbird, Sericulus ardens
Masked bowerbird, Sericulus aureus
 Fire-maned bowerbird, Sericulus bakeri
 Regent bowerbird, Sericulus chrysocephalus

Genus Ptilonorhynchus
 Satin bowerbird, Ptilonorhynchus violaceus

Genus Chlamydera
 Western bowerbird, Chlamydera guttata
 Spotted bowerbird, Chlamydera maculata
 Great bowerbird, Chlamydera nuchalis
 Yellow-breasted bowerbird, Chlamydera lauterbachi
 Fawn-breasted bowerbird, Chlamydera cerviniventris

Note that the Ptilonorhynchid catbirds, the grey catbird (Dumetella carolinensis) and black catbird (Melanoptila glabrirostris) from the Americas, and the Abyssinian catbird (Parophasma galinieri) from Africa are only related by their common name; they belong to different families.

References

External links

 Bowerbird videos on the Internet Bird Collection
 Bower bird nest building

 
Birds of Australia
Birds of New Guinea
Taxa named by George Robert Gray